Tapinopa is a genus of sheet weavers that was first described by Niklas Westring in 1851.

Species
 it contains eight species, found in Asia, Europe, and the United States:
Tapinopa bilineata Banks, 1893 – USA
Tapinopa disjugata Simon, 1884 – Portugal, France, Sardinia
Tapinopa gerede Saaristo, 1997 – Turkey
Tapinopa guttata Komatsu, 1937 – Russia, China, Japan
Tapinopa hentzi Gertsch, 1951 – USA
Tapinopa longidens (Wider, 1834) (type) – Europe, Turkey, Caucasus, China, Japan
Tapinopa undata Zhao & Li, 2014 – China
Tapinopa vara Locket, 1982 – China, Thailand, Malaysia (mainland), Indonesia (Sumatra)

See also
 List of Linyphiidae species (Q–Z)

References

Araneomorphae genera
Linyphiidae
Spiders of Asia
Spiders of North America